Karel Cudlín (born 28 June 1960) is a Czech photographer.

Career 
Cudlín was born in Prague and started taking photographs in his teens. Borrowing his father's Exakta and supported by his uncle, a photography enthusiast, Cudlín soon started photographing the Romani people of Žižkov, the suburb where he lived. Cudlín attended a social work school that, combined with a short stint in a low-grade job, provided him with the proletarian credentials needed to join the Fotografia cooperative. The cooperative sent him to a ballroom in the Lucerna area where he overcame considerable technical difficulties in photographing young people at night. A third area that he explored was Communist Party rituals.

After a year at Lidová škola umění, Cudlín was in 1983 admitted to FAMU, which was very free by Czechoslovakian standards of the time. He graduated in 1987, and soon found work at the weekly Mladý svět. During the summer of 1989, Cudlín made a cycle of photographs depicting East Germans escaping from their country with the help of the West German embassy in Prague. Following the Velvet Revolution and subsequent democratization of Czechoslovakia, he embarked on a series of relationships with other Czechoslovakian media sources, among them the newspapers Prostor and Lidové noviny and the ČTA agency. After ČTA closed in 1996, Cudlín became a freelance photographer. Additionally, he has worked as one of the personal photographers of the former Czech President Václav Havel.

Cudlín's new themes included refugees, Israel, the lingering Soviet forces within Czechoslovakia, Valdice prison, and, by accident, Ukraine (a putsch had interrupted Cudlín and Vojta Dukát's plan to go to Moscow). He has continued with a small number of long-term projects (Ukrainian  workers in Prague, hypermarkets), photographed in black and white.

Awards 
Cudlín has won seven awards in the major photographic competition in the Czech Republic, Czech Press Photo.

Notes

Books of Cudlín's works

Photographie. Prague: Torst, 1994.
(With Jindřich Marco.) Izrael (50). Prague: Argo, 1998. .
Silverio, Robert. Karel Cudlín. Prague: Torst, 2001.  Text in Czech and English.
(With Pavla Jazairiová.) Izrael a Palestina, Palestina a Izrael. V Praze: Radioservis, 2001. .
(With Tomki Němec.) Havel - fotografie = Havel - photographs. Liberec: Knihy 555, 2002. .
(With Monika MacDonagh-Pajerová.) Portrét české společnosi na prahu Evropy = Portrait of Czech society in the threshold of Europe. Brno: Petrov, 2004. .

External links
Cudlín's site (requires Flash)
Pasáže/Passageways detailed essay to accompany a 2004 exhibition at the Jewish Museum in Prague
Interview with Cudlín 

1960 births
Photographers from Prague
Living people
Portrait photographers
Academy of Performing Arts in Prague alumni